Derrick Lynn Deese (born May 17, 1970) is a former American football offensive tackle who played professionally in the National Football League (NFL).  He was a co-host for a radio show on Fox Sports Radio weekends from 9am to 1pm Pacific Time.

High school career
Deese prepped at Culver City High School. He is in the Culver City High School Hall Of Fame.

College career
Deese played college football at the University of Southern California (USC) after playing at El Camino College in Torrance, California. Deese is in the El Camino Hall of Fame. He is also in the California JC Football Hall Of Fame.

Professional career
Deese spent the majority of his career with the San Francisco 49ers from 1992 through 2003. He was All Pro two years. He played in the 49ers win in Super Bowl XXIX.  During this time, he primarily played the position of left tackle.  He played with the Tampa Bay Buccaneers in 2004 and 2005 and played all five positions on the offensive line during his career.

Personal
He has four sons, one who plays tight end at San Jose State. His son, Derrick Deese Jr., was signed undrafted to the Detroit Lions on April 30, 2022.

References

1970 births
Living people
American football offensive tackles
El Camino Warriors football players
San Francisco 49ers players
Tampa Bay Buccaneers players
USC Trojans football players
People from Culver City, California
Sportspeople from Los Angeles County, California
Players of American football from California